J. David Weeks (born September 24, 1953) is a member of the South Carolina House of Representatives, representing district 51 (Sumter County) (2000–incumbent). He is a member of the Democratic Party. He has served on the House Judiciary Committee and chaired the Legislative Black Caucus. Weeks now serves as Vice Chair of the House Ethics Committee and is a member of the Ways and Means Committee.

Weeks is an attorney. He lives in Sumter, South Carolina and has his offices in Columbia, South Carolina. He is married to the former Cheryl Elaine Hannibal; they have two children. He received a B.A. from Morris College in 1975, a J.D. degree from the University of South Carolina in 1989, and an M.Ed. from Howard University in 1996.  He is a member of Phi Beta Sigma fraternity.

References

External links

Democratic Party members of the South Carolina House of Representatives
Living people
1953 births
People from Sumter, South Carolina
African-American state legislators in South Carolina
21st-century American politicians
Politicians from Columbia, South Carolina
Morris College (South Carolina) alumni
21st-century African-American politicians
20th-century African-American people